Trabucco is a surname. Notable people with the surname include:

Armando Trabucco (1902–?), Argentine rower
Francesco Trabucco (1944–2021), Italian architect and designer
Marcelo Trabucco (born 1934), Argentine swimmer
Mario Trabucco (born 1951), Italian violinist
Mario Valery-Trabucco (born 1987), Canadian ice hockey player